Foster Emerson Sylvers (born February 25, 1962) is an American singer, songwriter, record producer, and multi-instrumentalist. He is best known for being a member of the family act The Sylvers and his hit single "Misdemeanor".

Biography
Foster Sylvers released his first album, Foster Sylvers, in June 1973. His first single, "Misdemeanor", written by his brother Leon Sylvers III, became a hit that summer, reaching number 7 on the Billboard R&B chart. "Misdemeanor"'s follow-up was a cover of Dee Clark's 1959 hit "Hey Little Girl", and charted at number 63 R&B in fall 1973. The popularity of these records led to Foster to appear on such TV shows as American Bandstand and Soul Train.

In 1974 he released his second album, Foster Sylvers Featuring Pat & Angie Sylvers. By 1975 he joined his brothers and sisters in The Sylvers just in time for the Showcase album. He co-sang lead with his brother Edmund on the number one 1976 Billboard Hot 100 and Hot Soul Singles song "Boogie Fever". While with Capitol, Foster released another self-titled album called Foster Sylvers in early 1978, primarily produced by his family The Sylvers and their managers Al Ross and Bob Cullen. Foster then branched out into studio work just like his big brother Leon collaborating on many projects such as with Dynasty ("Your Piece of the Rock", "When You Feel Like Giving Love", "Satisfied") and Evelyn "Champagne" King ("Shake Down", number 12 R&B, spring 1984). By the late 1980s, Foster recorded two albums as Foster Sylvers & Hy-Tech: 1987's Plain & Simple for EMI America and 1990's Prime Time for A&M.

In 1994, he was convicted of a sex offense, incarcerated, and remains on the list of sex offenders on the State of California Department of Justice Sex Offenders Profile.

Discography

Studio albums

Singles

References

External links
 Foster Sylvers at Discogs
 Foster Sylvers at All Music

1962 births
Living people
20th-century African-American male singers
American male pop singers
American rhythm and blues singers
American disco musicians
Capitol Records artists
21st-century African-American people